Tengiz Iremadze (Georgian: თენგიზ ირემაძე, German: Tengis Iremadse; born March 9, 1973, Sokhumi, Georgia) –  

Georgian Philosopher. The major fields of his study are: philosophy of mind (theory of intellect), philosophy of war and peace, sociology of terror, sociology of media and a new branch of philosophy - philosophical urbanism. He pays special attention to medieval, early modern and 
contemporary Georgian and European philosophy. Currently, Tengiz Iremadze is working on the historical and systematic analysis of Caucasian philosophy. His works are published in various languages. 
                                                                                                                                
Tengiz Iremadze became famous by his works dedicated to ancient philosophy (Pythagoras, Plato, Aristotle) and to the late antiquity (Proclus), also to medieval Georgian and Latin Christian thought (Ioane Petritsi, Theodoric of Freiberg, Berthold of Moosburg). His works on Friedrich Nietzsche (2006) and Walter Benjamin (2008) published in Georgian language are considered to be an exemplary academic studies in Georgian philosophy. Tengiz Iremadze had dedicated number of papers to Friedrich Nietzsche`s philosophy, which are published in several languages. In addition, he translated the works of Gottfried Wilhelm Leibniz, Walter Benjamin, Hans Blumenberg, André Glucksmann and Ernst Meister into the Georgian language. He is the editor of the Georgian translations of the works of Friedrich Nietzsche, Alexis de Tocqueville, Thomas Paine, Benjamin Franklin, Thomas Jefferson, James Wilson, Benjamin Rush, John Dewey, Henri Bergson, Carl Schmitt, Leo Strauss, Hannah Arendt and Niklas Luhmann.

Biography 

In 1993-1998 Tengiz Iremadze studied philosophy and sociology at Ivane Javakhishvili Tbilisi State University. From his academic teachers especially noteworthy is famous Georgian philosopher Guram Tevzadze. In his diploma thesis Tengiz Iremadze gave a new interpretation of Nietzsche`s "Thus Spoke Zarathustra", and therefore made an important contribution to Nietzsche`s studies in Georgia. In 2003 he earned his PhD degree in philosophy at Ruhr University Bochum under the supervision of outstanding German philosopher Burkhard Mojsisch (1944-2015). His PhD thesis was following: "Conceptions of Thought in Neo-Platonism. The Reception of Proclus` Philosophy in Medieval German and Georgian Thought. Dietrich of Freiberg - Berthold of Moosburg - Ioane Petritsi." The major merit of his work is considered to be the original philosophical research of theoretical concepts of antique and medieval Neo-Platonism expressed in the development of new intercultural model of typological-systematic interpretation of this heritage. This intercultural model of the historical study of philosophy gained special attention of many outstanding representatives of the field. Since 2007 Tengiz Iremadze is professor of philosophy and social sciences at Grigol Robakidze University(Tbilisi, Georgia) and the director of the Institute of Philosophy and Social Sciences of the same university. In 2015 he became professor of philosophy at New Georgian University (Poti, Georgia), and is the director of the Archive of Caucasian Philosophy and Theology of the same university. Tengiz Iremadze is chief editor and publisher of number of philosophical series in Georgia and Europe. Since 2014 together with German philosophers Udo Reinhold Jeck and Helmut Schneider he publishes scientific series "Philosophy and Social Theory" (Berlin, Publishing House "Logos").

Directions of the Philosophical Research

Intercultural Context of the History of Philosophy 

Already in his PhD thesis (2003) Tengiz Iremadze paid special attention to the concept of intercultural philosophy. In this work he analyzed the history of the reception of one of the central concepts (theory of thought) of outstanding thinker of late antiquity Proclus in medieval Latin West. At the same time in his study he incorporated old Georgian texts referring to the "Elements of Theology" (Ioane Petritsi`s translation and commentary of this important work of Proclus). Here, the possibility of intercultural comparison provided especially interesting perspective, as far as both lines of development (Western European and Georgian) existed independently and did not have any reference to each other. They had only one thing in common; both of them were based on  a late antique author (Proclus). Tengiz Iremadze perfectly understood that especially here, in totally different language cultures, the study of differences and similarities given in this interesting episode of the reception of Proclus` philosophy became possible. Therefore, his dissertation includes not only the history of reception of Proclus` philosophy. Tengiz Iremadze complexly discussed different approaches of interpretations of Proclus` philosophy and therefore laid foundations for this field of intercultural study. For this reason his work surpasses other analyses  dedicated to Ioane Petritsi, Theodoric of Freiberg and Berthold of Moosburg.

Caucasian philosophy 

Tengiz Iremadze fruitfully developed this direction of research in his work "Philosophy at the Crossroads of Epochs and Cultures" (2013). Here, based on the concept of "crossroad" he introduced new philosophical concept. In this work Tengiz Iremadze combined historical studies and systematic analysis and developed methodological preconditions and bases of "Caucasian Philosophy". He was the first to discuss Caucasian thought in united framework and first and foremost paid special attention to those thinkers who fostered the development of philosophical relationship between Caucasian countries. This work can be divided into three parts: in the introductory reflections Tengiz Iremadze develops methodological grounds and discusses the key concept of the "crossroad" from different perspectives. In the first part of the work is given the phenomenology of the "crossroad" from the important perspective of intercultural thought:

"[Crossroad] is a topos which can be understood as a place where different cultures, beliefs and worldviews meet and depart. [...] This is the starting point where the same and the other really meet each other. The crossroad can also become a concept designating intercultural dialogue. If the process of genuine communication and mutual understanding between individuals of different cultures and traditions is possible, then it will definitely happen at the crossroads. [...] The term "crossroad" is suitable for the characterization of Georgian philosophical and theological thought. I think that this metaphor most adequately expresses the character of Georgian thought. The latter can be understood as a topos which is a gathering of European and non-European, western and eastern cultures. The original, distinctive and unique character of Georgian thought should be sought in the process of philosophizing at the epistemological and conceptual edge, at the crossroads of various cultures, religions, and traditions."

In the second part of the work he discusses basic philosophical concepts [Being/Beings, Truth/Interpretation, Reception/Transformation, Individualism/Intersubjectivity, Knowledge/Wisdom], which have been not only important throughout the history of philosophy, but will also have a great value in the future. In the third part Tengiz Iremadze discusses new concepts of intercultural thought. The concept of "crossroad" also plays important role here, because it underpins new intercultural philosophical theory.

Tengiz Iremadze`s above-mentioned work provides fruitful grounds for the study of intercultural phenomena. On the one hand, here certain cultural space ("Caucasian philosophy") is outlined and clearly is indicated its connections to other philosophical cultures. On the other hand, in this work is given a theory which is in close relation with hermeneutical practices as well as with the systematic problems of philosophy.

Reception 

Tengiz Iremadze`s works gained international attention in many respects. His article on Ioane Petritsi is published in Stanford Encyclopedia of Philosophy. Despite the fact, that his doctoral thesis unequivocally belongs to the history of philosophy, he later paid special attention to systematic philosophical studies. In his works he pays equal attention to problems of classical as well as of the contemporary philosophy. His thesis according to which Caucasian philosophy has not been treated properly in the history of philosophy gained international reception and changed existing paradigms in this regard. His students and colleagues (especially noteworthy in this regard are Giorgi Tavadze and Giorgi Khuroshvili) fruitfully work on these issues at the Archive of Caucasian Philosophy and Theology of New Georgian University.

Selected works

 Konzeptionen des Denkens im Neuplatonismus. Zur Rezeption der Proklischen Philosophie im deutschen und georgischen Mittelalter: Dietrich von Freiberg – Berthold von Moosburg – Joane Petrizi (Bochumer Studien zur Philosophie, Bd. 40), Amsterdam/Philadelphia: B. R. Grüner Publishing Company, 2004, .
 Friedrich Nietzsche: "Thus Spoke Zarathustra": Text and Context, Tbilisi: Publishing House "Nekeri", 2006,  (in Georgian). 
 Der Aletheiologische Realismus. Schalwa Nuzubidse und seine neuen Denkansätze, Tbilisi: Verlag "Nekeri", 2008, .
 Walter Benjamin. Life  – Work – Actuality, Tbilisi: Publishing House "Nekeri", 2008,  (in Georgian).
 (Co-author) What is Freedom? Great Thinkers on the Essence of Freedom. Charles-Louis Montesquieu, Jean-Jacques Rousseau, Georg Wilhelm Friedrich Hegel, Herbert Spencer, Erich Fromm, Tbilisi: Publishing House "Nekeri", First edition, 2010, ; Second edition  - 2013:  (in Georgian).
 Philosophy at the Crossroads of Epochs and Cultures, Tbilisi: Publishing House "Nekeri", 2013,  (in Georgian).
 (Co-author) Early Modern Georgian Philosophy and its Major Representatives (second half of the 18th century – second half of the 19th century), Scientific editor: T. Iremadze, Tbilisi: "Favorite Style" 2014,  (in Georgian).
 (Co-author) Philosophical Urbanism, editor: T. Iremadze, H. Schneider, Tbilisi: Publishing House "Nekeri", 2014,  (in Georgian).

Further reading 

 Giorgi Baramidze, Mikheil Gogatishvili, Lali Zakaradze, Udo Reinhold Jeck, Duane J. Lacey (eds.): (Neo)Platonism and Modernity. Materials of the International Conference dedicated to Tengiz Iremadze’s book "Konzeptionen des Denkens im Neuplatonismus", June 30, 2008, Grigol Robakidze University, Tbilisi 2009 (Georgian/English).
 Udo Reinhold Jeck: Erläuterungen zur georgischen Philosophie, Tbilisi: Verlag "Nekeri", 2010, 2. Auflage 2012.
 Giorgi Tavadze: The Power of Maps. Gelati and the Concept of Caucasian Philosophy in the Context of Intercultural Philosophy, Tbilisi: Verlag "Nekeri", 2013 (in Georgian).
 Giorgi Khuroshvili: Jerusalem and Athens in Medieval Georgian Thought. In: T. Iremadze, U. R. Jeck, H. Schneider (eds.), Leben verstehen (Philosophie und Sozialtheorie, Bd. 1), Berlin: Logos Verlag, 2014, pp. 97–101.
 Lali Zakaradze: Proclus in the Georgian and Latin Middle Ages (Ioane Petritsi and Berthold of Moosburg). In: Philosophy in Global Change: Jubilee volume dedicated to the 65th anniversary of Burkhard Mojsisch, ed. T. Iremadze (in collaboration with H. Schneider and K. J. Schmidt), Tbilisi: Verlag "Nekeri", 2011, pp. 125–132.

References

External links 
 National Parliamentary Library of Georgia 
 Tengiz Iremadze, Stanford Encyclopedia of Philosophy
 Konzeptionen des Denkens im Neuplatonismus
 Tengiz Iremadze, The Pythagorean Doctrine in the Caucasus

Philosophers of mind
Philosophers from Georgia (country)
Historians of philosophy
1973 births
Living people